Madolyn Smith is a retired American actress, known for her roles in the films Urban Cowboy (1980), 2010: The Year We Make Contact (1984), and Funny Farm (1988).

Career
Smith first came to public attention with her role as Pam in the 1980 film Urban Cowboy. She later co-starred in the films 2010 (1984), the sequel to 2001: A Space Odyssey, and All of Me (1984), a Steve Martin-Lily Tomlin comedy. Reviewing the latter film, Pauline Kael wrote in The New Yorker that Smith was a "talented and stunning brunette ... who knows how to make guile and bitchery funny, and who has a comic charge comparable to Lily Tomlin's." In the early 1980s she also appeared in several TV movies, including Pray TV, Rehearsal for Murder and Deadly Intentions. She portrayed Jehan Sadat, wife of Egyptian president Anwar Sadat, in the 1983 TV miniseries Sadat, and played Ernie Kovacs' wife Dorothy in the 1984 TV movie Ernie Kovacs: Between the Laughter.

Smith starred as Tracy Whitney in the 1986 TV miniseries If Tomorrow Comes, based on the Sidney Sheldon novel of the same name. She subsequently costarred in films like Funny Farm (1988) opposite Chevy Chase and The Super (1991) with Joe Pesci; the 1990 TV movies The Plot to Kill Hitler and The Rose and the Jackal; and the 1990 miniseries The Kennedys of Massachusetts.

Smith guest-starred in a 1989 episode of the sitcom Cheers titled "What's Up, Doc?". She was the first choice of the creators to replace Shelley Long. She also appeared in multiple episodes of the 1993 drama series Class of '96. Her last TV appearance was in a 1994 episode of Due South, after which she formally retired. Smith later provided some narration in the 2010 documentary film Louis Sullivan: The Struggle for American Architecture.

Personal life
Born in Albuquerque, New Mexico, Smith graduated from the University of Southern California. She married National Hockey League player Mark Osborne in 1988.

Filmography

References

External links
 
 
 Madolyn Smith at Trading Card Database

Living people
Actresses from Albuquerque, New Mexico
University of Southern California alumni
American film actresses
American television actresses
20th-century American actresses
Year of birth missing (living people)
21st-century American women